Harold Stevenson is a retired Irish international lawn bowler.

Bowls career
He won a bronze medal in the fours at the 1970 British Commonwealth Games in Edinburgh with John Higgins, William Tate and Edward Gordon.

References

Living people
Male lawn bowls players from Northern Ireland
Commonwealth Games bronze medallists for Northern Ireland
Commonwealth Games medallists in lawn bowls
Bowls players at the 1970 British Commonwealth Games
Year of birth missing (living people)
Medallists at the 1970 British Commonwealth Games